Elizabeth Egerton, Countess of Bridgewater  (née Lady Elizabeth Cavendish; 1626 – 14 July 1663) was an English writer who married into the Egerton family.

Biography
Elizabeth Cavendish was encouraged in her literary interests from a young age by her father, William Cavendish, 1st Duke of Newcastle, himself an author and patron of the arts surrounded by a literary coterie which included Ben Jonson, Thomas Shadwell, and John Dryden. Her works consist of a series of manuscripts, some few of which have recently become available in modern editions.

She married John Egerton (Lord Brackley) in 1641, when she was fifteen. Her mother, Elizabeth Bassett, died in 1643, and her father was later remarried to noted writer Margaret Cavendish. William Cavendish and his sons relocated to France during the English Civil War, while Egerton and her sisters Jane and Frances remained at the besieged family seat in Nottinghamshire until 1645 when she relocated to her husband's home where she was relatively sheltered from the rest of the war. Egerton's earliest manuscript compilation (Bodl. Oxf., MS Rawl. poet. 16; Yale University, Beinecke Library, Osborn MS b. 233), an anthology of poems and dramas, Poems Songs a Pastorall and a Play by the Right Honorable the Lady Jane Cavendish and Lady Elizabeth Brackley, co-written with her sister, dates from this period. The Concealed Fansyes, the play mentioned in that title, "features two heroines who hold out for and get 'equall marryage,' having trained the gallants, Courtley and Praesumption, who were intending to train them." Egerton's final manuscript collection, known as the "Loose Papers," is made up of prayers, meditations, and essays, some written in response to the illness and death of her children — only four of whom survived to adulthood — and some to pregnancy and childbirth:

O Lord, I knowe thou mightest have smothered this my Babe in the wombe, but thou art ever mercyfull, and hast at this time brought us both from greate dangers, and me from the greate torture of childbirth.

Elizabeth Egerton died delivering her tenth child and was buried at Ashridge, Hertfordshire. Her manuscripts are held at the Nottingham University Library, Portland collection (letters); the Bodleian and Beinecke libraries (Poems Songs &c.); and the British and Huntington Libraries (her "Loose Papers"). Her essays on marriage and widowhood "open a highly unusual window on the thinking of a seventeenth-century woman."

Selected works 

 Cheyne, Jane, Lady, 1621–1669 and Egerton, Elizabeth Cavendish, 1626–1663. The Concealed Fansyes: A Play by Lady Jane Cavendish and Lady Elizabeth Brackley. Edited by Nathan Comfort Starr. PMLA, Vol. 46, No. 3 (Sep., 1931), pp. 802–838. Copyright not renewed. 
With Jane Cavendish. From "A Pastorall"; "An answeare to my Lady Alice Edgertons Songe"; "On my Boy Henry"; and "On the death of my Deare Sister." Rprt. Kissing the Rod: an anthology of seventeenth-century women's verse. Germaine Greer et al., eds. Farrar Staus Giroux, 1988. 106-118.

Notes

Further reading
Alexandra G. Bennett, "'Now let my language speake': The Authorship, Rewriting, and Audience(s) of Jane Cavendish and Elizabeth Brackley". Early Modern Literary Studies 11.2 (September 2005): 3.1–13
"Blain, Virginia, et al., eds. Cavendish, Lady Jane, later Cheyne, 1621-69, and Lady Elizabeth, 1626-63." The Feminist Companion to Literature in English. New Haven and London: Yale UP, 1990. 190-191.
Elizabeth Brackley and Jane Cavendish, The Concealed Fancies (c. 1645), Renaissance Drama by Women: Texts and Documents, S. P. Cerasano and Marion Wynne-Davies, eds. New York and London: Routledge, 1996
Ezell, Margaret J. M., "To Be Your Daughter in Your Pen: The Social Functions of Literature in the Writings of Lady Elizabeth Brackley and Lady Jane Cavendish". Huntington Library Quarterly 51.4 (1988) pp. 281–296
Findlay, Alison. "Playing the 'scene self' in Jane Cavendish and Elizabeth Brackley's The Concealed Fancies". Enacting Gender on the English Renaissance Stage. Ed. Anne Russell and Viviana Comensoli. Chicago: U of Chicago P, 1999, pp. 154–176
 Greer, Germaine, et al., eds. "Lady Jane Cavendish and Lady Elizabeth Brackley."Kissing the Rod: an anthology of seventeenth-century women's verse. Farrar Straus Giroux, 1988. 106-118.

Stanton, Kamille Stone, "The Domestication of Royalist Themes in the Manuscript Writings of Jane Cavendish and Elizabeth Brackley", Clio: A Journal of Literature, History and the Philosophy of History 36:2 (Spring 2007)
Wynne-Davies, Marion, "Jane and Elizabeth Cavendish"; "Jane Cavendish"; "Elizabeth Cavendish", Women Poets of the Renaissance''. London: J. M. Dent, 1998

1626 births
1663 deaths
17th-century English women writers
17th-century English writers
Daughters of English dukes
Bridgewater
English women dramatists and playwrights
English women poets
Cavendish family
Deaths in childbirth
Egerton family